"Heaven Help" is a song by American rock musician Lenny Kravitz, released in August 1993, as the third single from his third studio album, Are You Gonna Go My Way (1993). The song made a brief appearance on the US Billboard Hot 100, reaching number 92. In the United Kingdom, it became his second top-twenty hit from Are You Gonna Go My Way, peaking at number 20, and in Canada and New Zealand, the song reached the top 30. It was later included on Kravitz' compilation album Greatest Hits.

Critical reception
Speed and Martinucci from the Gavin Report noted that accompanied simply by a piano and guitar, "Kravitz comes with a soulful love song that's reminiscent early '70s soul ballads recorded with real instruments." The magazine's Dave Sholin concluded, "This release should help win him even more fans." Adam Sweeting from The Guardian felt Kravitz is "squeezing a mellow soulful feel" out of the song. In his weekly UK chart commentary, James Masterton commented, "Third hit in a row for the superstar finds him this time wearing his Isley Brothers influences on his sleeve." Alan Jones from Music Week wrote, "A gentle and intimate delight, sweet and understated, with hints of Curtis Mayfield. Given plenty of airplay, there's no reason why it shouldn't make the Top 20."

Music video
A music video was produced to promote the single, directed by Per Gustafsson.

Track listings

 US maxi-CD single
 "Heaven Help" – 3:10
 "Spinning Around Over You" – 3:35
 "B Side Blues" – 3:32
 "Are You Gonna Go My Way – 3:30
 "Freedom Time" / "Always on the Run" (live) – 9:42

 US cassette single
 "Heaven Help" – 3:10
 "Spinning Around Over You" – 3:34

 UK CD1
 "Heaven Help"
 "Eleutheria"
 "Sister" (live)
 "Heaven Help" (acoustic version)

 UK CD2 and 12-inch single, Australasian CD single
 "Heaven Help" – 3:09
 "Eleutheria" – 4:48
 "Ascension" – 3:45
 "Brother" – 4:16

 UK 7-inch and cassette single, European CD single
 "Heaven Help" – 3:10
 "Eleutheria" – 4:48

 European maxi-CD single
 "Heaven Help"
 "Ascension"
 "Brother"
 "Sister" (live)
 "Heaven Help" (acoustic version)

 Japanese mini-album
 "Heaven Help"
 "Brother"
 "Ascension"
 "I Build This Garden for Us"
 "Fields of Joy"
 "Stand by My Woman"
 "Sister" (live)
 "Heaven Help" (acoustic version)

Charts

References

1993 songs
1993 singles
1990s ballads
Lenny Kravitz songs
Song recordings produced by Lenny Kravitz
Songs written by Terry Britten
Songs written by Gerry DeVeaux
Soul ballads
Virgin Records singles